The acronym RHC may refer to:

 Relativistic heat conduction
 The Black Watch (Royal Highland Regiment) of Canada
 Radio Havana Cuba
 Recueil des Historiens des Croisades, a major collection of medieval primary source documents about the Crusades
 Receding Horizon Control, another name for Model predictive control
 Red Hand Commandos, a Loyalist paramilitary group in Northern Ireland
 Rosehill College, a school in South Auckland
 Rural health clinic
 C-scale of the Rockwell hardness scale
 The Royal Hashemite Court
 Royal Holloway College, University of London